Phantom of the Rapra is the second solo studio album by American rapper Bushwick Bill. It was released on July 11, 1995 through Rap-A-Lot Records with distribution via Noo Trybe Records. Recording sessions took place at Lil J's Studio in Houston. Production was handled by Mike Dean, John Bido, Clement Burnette, John "Swift" Catalon, CJ Mac and Freddie Young with executive producer J. Prince. It features guest appearances from 3D, CJ Mac, Menace Clan and Sherm.

The album peaked at number 43 on the Billboard 200 albums chart in the United States.

Track listing

Sample credits
Only God Knows
"Walk On By" by Isaac Hayes
Times Is Hard
"I Found Love (When I Found You)" by The Spinners
Wha Cha Gonna Do?
"Bridge of Sighs" by Robin Trower

Personnel
Richard Stephen Shaw – main artist, coordinator
Dante L. Miller – featured artist (track 10)
3D – featured artist (track 11)
Sherm – featured artist (track 9)
Menace Clan – featured artists (track 10)
Bryaan Ross – additional vocals (tracks: 4-6), producer (tracks: 4, 6)
John Okuribido – producer (tracks: 1, 2, 5, 8, 12), mixing, coordinator
Michael George Dean – producer (tracks: 1, 2, 5, 8, 9, 12), engineering, mixing
Clement "MAD" Burnette – producer (tracks: 3, 4, 6)
John "Swift" Catalon – producer (tracks: 7, 10)
Freddie Young – producer (track 11)
James A. Smith – executive producer
Dave Collins – mastering
"Jazzy" Jeff Griffin – assistant mixing and engineering
Troy "Pee Wee" Clark – assistant engineering
Patricia Sullivan – assistant mastering
Jason Clark – art direction, design
Dré – art direction
Tar – photography

Charts

Weekly charts

Year-end charts

References

External links

1995 albums
Bushwick Bill albums
Rap-A-Lot Records albums
Albums produced by Mike Dean (record producer)